

Belgium
 Belgian Congo 
 Théophile Wahis, Governor-General of the Belgian Congo (1908–1912)
 Félix Fuchs, Governor-General of the Belgian Congo (1912–1916)

France
 French Somaliland – Pierre Hubert Auguste Pascal, Governor of French Somaliland (1911–1915)
 Guinea –
 Camille Guy, Lieutenant-Governor of Guinea (1910–1912)
 Jean Louis Georges Poiret, acting Lieutenant-Governor of Guinea (1912–1913)

Japan
 Karafuto – Hiraoka Teitarō, Governor-General of Karafuto (12 June 1908 – 5 June 1914)
 Korea – Terauchi Masatake, Governor-General of Korea (1910–1916)
 Taiwan – Sakuma Samata, Governor-General of Taiwan (15 April 1906 – May 1915)

Portugal
 Angola –
 Manuel Maria Coelho, Governor-General of Angola (1911–1912)
 José Mendes Ribeiro Norton de Matos, Governor-General of Angola (1912–1915)

United Kingdom
 Bechuanaland
High Commissioner - Viscount Gladstone, High Commissioner for Southern Africa (1910–1914)
Resident Commissioner - Francis William Panzera, Resident Commissioner of Bechuanaland (1906–1916)
 Malta Colony – Leslie Rundle, Governor of Malta (1909–1915)
 Northern Rhodesia – Lawrence Aubrey Wallace, Administrator of Northern Rhodesia (1911–1921)

United States
 Hawaii - Walter F. Frear (1907–1913), Territorial Governor of Hawaii

Colonial governors
Colonial governors
1912